Mighty High is a French-bred Hong Kong based racehorse. He was one of the nominees of 2010–2011 Hong Kong Horse of the Year.

Background
Mighty High is a bay gelding bred in France by the Aga Khan. He was sired by the Prix de l'Arc de Triomphe winner Peintre Celebre.

Racing career
As a three-year-old, Mighty High was trained in France by Alain de Royer-Dupré and won two of his four races in 2009. He was then sold and exported to race in Hong Kong. Racing at Sha Tin Racecourse he won the Centenary Vase and the Hong Kong Champions & Chater Cup in 2011.

References
 The Hong Kong Jockey Club – Mighty High Racing Record
 The Hong Kong Jockey Club

Racehorses trained in Hong Kong
Hong Kong racehorses
2006 racehorse births
Racehorses bred in France
Thoroughbred family 1-h